The Criollo Mexicano is a Mexican breed or group of breeds of Criollo cattle – that is, cattle that derive principally from the Iberian cattle brought to the Americas by the Conquistadores from the time of the Second Voyage of Christopher Columbus in 1493.

History 

Iberian cattle were brought to the Americas by the Conquistadores, and were introduced in the sixteenth and seventeenth centuries to various parts of what is now Mexico. Cattle were first brought into Mexico from the islands of the Caribbean in 1521 and gradually spread throughout the territory of the country. They were in the area of Mexico City by about 1535, and by 1565 had spread as far as the Pacific coast of Nayarit. Within a hundred years or so they had reached the deserts of Chihuahua and Sonora, including Baja California.

A breed society, the Asociación de Criadores de Ganado Criollo Mexicano, was formed in 1995.

References 

Cattle breeds
Cattle breeds originating in Mexico